Lipowa Street is a representative street at the center of Białystok, Poland, running from the Kościuszko Square (corner of Spółdzielcza Street) to Romana Dmowskiego Niepodległości Square (corner of Krakowska street). The street is made up of low buildings mostly of 2-3 floors with various shops, offices and restaurants located at the ground floor.

Name
The name of the street comes from a row of lime which grew here in the 18th-20th centuries. Over the centuries, the name of this exclusive and representative Białystok street in the city center took various names: Choroska, Nowolipie, Lipowa, Józefa Piłsudskiego, Sovietskaya, Lindenstrasse, Józefa Stalina to finally return to its original name after World War II: Lipowa.

History
Behind the corner tenement (in its place was once the inn "Pod Łabędziem", belonging to Andruszka - the lover of Jan Klemens Branicki), ending from the north with the western frontage of Kościuszko Square, Lipowa Street begins. Its name comes from a row of lime trees that grew along it in the second half of the 18th century, but at that time it was still called Choroska Street and later Nowolip. At the beginning of the 20th century it was already called Lipowa.

In the interwar period, it was called the street of Marshall Józef Piłsudski, then generalissimo Józef Stalin, then fűhrer Adolf Hitler, again generalissimo Stalin and finally Lipowa again. The street in 1944 was almost completely destroyed by the Nazis.

Moving westwards is the Cristal Hotel, the first real post-war hotel in Bialystok in Poland, and located the intersection with Liniarskiego and Malmeda streets..

On the other side of Liniarskiego Street stands the Orthodox Cathedral of St. Nicholas, built in 1843–1846. It is a classicist building, built on the plan of a Greek cross.  From 1951, the church of St. Nicholas serves as a diocesan cathedral, is also the seat of the parish of St. Nicholas. The administration of the Orthodox diocese of Białystok-Gdańsk, the Center of Orthodox Culture and the Department of Orthodox Theology at the University of Bialystok are located at the church.

In front of the church is the intersection of Lipowa Malmeda Street leading to a small square. There is a statue of Ludwik Zamenhof, the creator of the international language Esperanto, who was born in Bialystok in 1859. In that intersection during the Holocaust stood one of the gates leading to the Jewish ghetto in the city.

Lipowa Street runs further west towards the church of St. Rocha. Following it in Lipowa 14, is the building where the first self-service store in Poland was built, the "Pokój" cinema, and on the opposite side of the street the Art Nouveau palace of Chaim Nowik, which now houses the Military Command of Supplements, a building slightly removed from the street of the former Jewish Craft School (currently Complex of Vocational Schools) which is an example of a famous work in the interwar years the Białystok masonry school and - on the other side - a very nice, neoclassical tenement house with caryatids supporting the balcony.

References

External links

Białystok
Białystok
Transport in Białystok